The 2020–21 Coupe de France preliminary rounds, Brittany was the qualifying competition to decide which teams from the leagues of the Brittany region of France took part in the main competition from the seventh round.

A total of twelve teams qualified from the Brittany Preliminary rounds. In 2019–20, FC Guichen and Stade Briochin progressed the furthest in the main competition, reaching the ninth round before losing to Caen (1–2) and ESM Gonfreville (on penalties) respectively.

Schedule
A total of 687 teams entered from the region. 666 teams entered at the first round stage, which took place on 30 August 2020, with one team given a bye to the second round. The first round draw was published on 30 July 2020. The second round draw was published on 1 September 2020.

The third round draw, which featured the teams from Championnat National 3, was made on 10 September 2020. The fourth round draw, which featured the teams from Championnat National 2, was made on 23 September 2020. The fifth round draw, which saw the two Championnat National teams from the region enter the competition, was made on 7 October 2020. The sixth round draw was made on 21 October 2020.

First round
These matches were played on 29 and 30 August 2020.

Second round
These matches were played on 5 and 6 September 2020.

Third round
These matches were played on 19 and 20 September 2020.

Fourth round
These matches were played on 3 and 4 October 2020, with one postponed until 11 October 2020.

Fifth round
These matches were played on 17 and 18 October 2020, with three postponed until 25 October 2020.

Sixth round
These matches were played on 31 January 2021.

References

Preliminary rounds